Ashley Weinhold (born June 20, 1989) is a former tennis player from the United States. She turned professional in 2007 and had her last appearance on the ITF Circuit in August 2018.

Her career-high singles ranking is 181, achieved October 2011. On 12 June 2017, she peaked at No. 109 in the WTA doubles rankings.

Weinhold received six various entries into the US Open but always failed to reach round two. She enjoyed playing on clay, and has been playing tennis since age two. She could not win a title on tournaments of the WTA Tour. However, she won a total of 20 titles on the ITF Women's Circuit, three in singles and seventeen in doubles.

Career

US Open
Weinhold received a wildcard into the 2006 US Open qualifying draw, and lost in the final round. She also was given a wildcard to enter the doubles event with Jamie Hampton, they lost to Anna Chakvetadze and Elena Vesnina, 2–6, 2–6 in the first round. She received a wildcard to compete in mixed doubles with Donald Young, they lost to Fabrice Santoro and Nathalie Dechy, 2–6, 3–6.

In 2007, Weinhold received another wildcard into the main draw of the US Open but lost to Chakvetadze, 1–6, 1–6. In doubles, she was also handed a wildcard, partnering Madison Brengle but lost in the first round to Stéphanie Foretz and Yaroslava Shvedova, 0–6, 3–6. Ashley and Ryan Sweeting lost in the first round of the mixed-doubles competition to Vladimíra Uhlířová and Simon Aspelin, 6–4, 3–6, [8–10].

ITF finals

Singles (3–5)

Doubles (17–7)

References

External links
 
 
 
 

1989 births
Living people
American female tennis players
Sportspeople from Tyler, Texas
Tennis people from Texas
People from Burnet County, Texas
21st-century American women